Shaun Chen (born 3 November 1978) is a Malaysian actor and former national badminton player who is based in Singapore. He started as a host for the variety show City Beat alongside Sharon Au, Jeff Wang and Fiona Xie. In 2003, he made his debut acting in True Heroes and Holland V. He received his first award, the Rocket Award, at the Star Awards 2015. He starred as the lead character in both Blessings and The Journey: Tumultuous Times. He won the Best Actor award for The Journey: Tumultuous Times and was voted in the Top 10 Most Popular Male Artistes list at the Star Awards 2015.

Early life and education 
Chen was born in Jelebu, Negri Sembilan, Malaysia. He was the youngest of seven children.

When Chen was 13, he went to Seremban to study and became a badminton player for the state. Although he tried for the national team, he failed to qualify for it. Chen subsequently earned a diploma in electronic and electrical engineering from a private college.

Career
Prior to coming to Singapore, Chen had worked in many jobs, electrician, car spray-painter, credit card and spectacle salesman model in Malaysia and appeared on billboards for Maxis.

Early in his career Chen was known for playing villains and earned a Best Supporting Actor nomination in the Star Awards 2006 for his role in CID.

In 2011, Chen starred in the top-rated drama serial Love Thy Neighbour. In 2015, Chen won the Best Actor award on his second nomination in the Star Awards 2015 ceremony for his role in The Journey: Tumultuous Times. In Star Awards 2018, he was nominated for Best Actor for the drama, My Friends From Afar.

Personal life
Chen married his girlfriend of 6 years, Michelle Chia, in May 2009. The couple confirmed their divorce on 27 April 2011 but insist they still remain friends.

In July 2015, Chen married his Malaysian girlfriend, Celine Chin. His relationship with Chin was not revealed until October 2015, when he announced that they were going to have a baby. They have two daughters.

Filmography

Television

Film

Discography

Compilation album

Awards and nominations

References

External links

Living people
People from Negeri Sembilan
Singaporean male television actors
Malaysian people of Chinese descent
Malaysian people of Hakka descent
Singaporean people of Hakka descent
Malaysian male television actors
21st-century Malaysian male actors
1978 births